Ronkẹ Adékoluẹjo  is an English actress. She is known for her roles as Jack Starbright in the Amazon Prime spy thriller Alex Rider (2020–) and Yvonne in the Netflix musical film Been So Long (2018). She also guest-starred in two episodes of Doctor Who (2017).

On stage, her work includes Three Sisters at the National Theatre, (2020), Lava at Bush Theatre, (2021), and Blues for an Alabama Sky (2022).

Early life 
Ronkẹ Adékoluẹjo is an English actress of Nigerian ancestry, from London, England. Adékoluẹjo studied acting for three years from 2010 at the Royal Academy of Dramatic Art (RADA), in London, graduating in 2013 with a Bachelor of Arts degree in Acting (H Level).

Theatre
Adékoluẹjo crafted her acting skills on the theatre stage, in productions such as Pride and Prejudice, at the Sheffield Crucible (2015), The Mountain Top at the Young Vic (2016), Twelfth Night at the Filter Theatre in Hammersmith (2016). In 2020, Adékoluẹjo appeared on stage in the role of Abosede in the live-streaming theatre play Three Sisters at National Theatre Live, and was nominated for best classical stage performances by actors under the age of 30 at the Ian Charleson Awards. However, the event was postponed due to the COVID-19 pandemic. 

In August 2021, Adékoluẹjo performed "solo" on stage, live-streamed worldwide, in the Benedict Lombe-directed play Lava at the Bush Theatre. She won 'Best perfomance Piece' for this work, at The Offies in 2022.

In 2022, she starred as Delia in the all-black American tragicomedy,Blues for an Alabama Sky, written by Pearl Cleage, and based on the Harlem Renaissance in 1930s New York. Her performance earned a nomination at the  Evening Standard Theatre Awards
for Best Actress

Film and television
From 2014, Adékoluẹjo had some single-episode appearances in TV series until starring in Doctor Who (series 10), when she played Penny in both Extremis  and The Pyramid at the End of the World, alongside Peter Capaldi (the Twelfth Doctor) and his companions Pearl Mackie. Adékoluẹjo starred as Demi-Lea Sadler in the "Nadia Cavelle" short film Lascivious Grace, which premiered at the Underwire Film festival 2017 and was an official film selection for the Bermuda International Film Festival 2018. Adékoluẹjo was nominated for best actor at Underwire Film Festival 2017 for her performance in the short film Lascivious Grace.

In 2018, Ronke starred in the Tinge Krishnan-directed Netflix musical Been So Long, as the character Yvonne, best friend of Simone, played by lead actress Michaela Coel. The film was shown at the 2018 BFI London Film Festival. In 2019, Adékoluẹjo landed a main role in the Amazon Prime teenage spy thriller television series Alex Rider as Jack Starbright, Alex Rider's American primary carer and mentor.

In 2021, Adékoluẹjo played Ṣadé in the pilot of the Channel 4 television production Big Age.

Filmography

Film

Live streaming theatre

Television

Awards and nominations

References

External links 
 
 Scott Marshall profile - Ronkẹ Adékoluẹjo 
 Ronkẹ Adékoluẹjo twitter

Living people
21st-century English actresses
Actresses from London
Black British actresses
English television actresses
English film actresses
English people of Nigerian descent
Year of birth missing (living people)